Fight Back! with David Horowitz was a weekly consumer advocate show that ran from 1976–1992. The show, hosted by David Horowitz, informed consumers about corporations and other big businesses whose products were of poor quality. The format of the show allowed for some humorous segments, such as allowing people to send in photos of unintentionally funny signs (similar to Jay Leno's Headlines). In 1987, the show was awarded best public affairs series for a network station and Horowitz also received a regional Emmy for host/moderator.

History 
In February 1980, the pilot episode of Fight Back! With David Horowitz was broadcast. As explained in a news article, Fight Back! was the same show as Consumer Buyline, but with a "larger budget." The pilot episode featured a segment shot in North Carolina, as well as a commercial challenge of a Volkswagen Rabbit. Fight Back! formally replaced "Consumer Buyline" in September 1980.

After the television show wrapped, David Horowitz continued work under the Fight Back! banner.  Since 2013 the Fight Back! brand has been owned and operated by David Horowitz's daughter Amanda Horowitz, who has continued the work after her father's 2019 death.

References

External links 

Consumer protection television series
1980 American television series debuts
1992 American television series endings
First-run syndicated television programs in the United States
Television series by CBS Studios
Westinghouse Broadcasting